Events in the year 1994 in Germany.

Incumbents
President - Richard von Weizsäcker (until 30 June), Roman Herzog (starting 1 July)
Chancellor – Helmut Kohl

Events

 February 10–21 - 44th Berlin International Film Festival
 March 9: Euskirchen court shooting
 March 21 - Germany in the Eurovision Song Contest 1994
 July 28: 2 paintings are stolen from the Kunsthalle Schirn, an event that is now known as Frankfurt art theft of 1994.
 November 15 - The Fifth Kohl cabinet led by Helmut Kohl was sworn in.
 Date unknown - German company Volkswagen Group acquired control of Czech company Škoda.

Elections

 1994 German federal election
 1994 German presidential election
 European Parliament election

Births
January 19 –  Matthias Ginter, German football player
February 1 – Anna-Lena Friedsam, tennis player
February 3 – Malaika Mihambo, German athlete
March 13 – Yannick Gerhardt, German footballer
May 14 – Fabian Heinle, German long jumper
August 27  – Domenic Weinstein, German cyclist
September 2 – Florian Vogel, German swimmer
October 14 – Sönke Rothenberger, German equestrian

Deaths
January 9 - Joachim Werner, German archaeologist (born 1909)
January 19 - Willi Geiger, German judge (born 1909)
January 31 - Erwin Strittmatter, German writer (born 1912)
February 5 - Hermann Josef Abs, German banker (born 1901)
February 21 - Johannes Steinhoff, German Luftwaffe fighter ace (born 1913)
March 18 - Günter Mittag, German politician (born 1926)
March 18 - Peter Borgelt, German actor (born 1927)
March 27 – Elisabeth Schmid, German archaeologist and osteologist (born 1912)
April 7 - Golo Mann, German historian, essayist and writer (born 1909)
April 24 - Margot Trooger, German actress (born 1923)
July 23 - Klaus Hemmerle, German bishop of Roman Catholic Church (born 1929)
July 26 - Ernst Schröder, German actor (born 1915)
August 13 - Manfred Wörner, German politician (born 1934)
September 10 - Max Morlock, German footballer (born 1925)
September 26 - Louis Ferdinand, Prince of Prussia, son of Kaiser Wilhelm II  (born 1907)
October 3 - Heinz Rühmann, German actor (born 1902)
December 9 - Heinz Graffunder, architect (born 1926)
December 26 - Karl Schiller, German politician (born 1911)

References

 
Years of the 20th century in Germany
1990s in Germany
Germany
Germany